Soundararaja Iyengar Parthasarathy (died 1965) was an Indian journalist who served as editor-in-chief of The Hindu from 1959 to 1965.

Early life 
Parthasarathy was born in Madras, British India to civil servant, S. Soundararaja Iyengar. Soundararaja Iyengar was the second son of Sesha Iyengar; he was the younger brother of S. Srinivasa Raghavaiyangar and the elder brother of S. Kasturi Ranga Iyengar. Parthasarathy had his education in Madras and joined The Hindu as sub-editor in September 1924.

Career 
Parthasarathy gradually became Assistant Editor and on the death of its chief editor, K. Srinivasan in 1959, became its editor-in-chief with G. Narasimhan as Managing-Director. Parthasarathy served as Chief Editor until his own death in 1965. Parthasarathy was known for his moderate views. During his tenure as editor, the newspaper following a safe path and avoided controversy.

Death 
Parthasarathy died in 1965 and was succeeded by G. Kasturi as editor-in-chief.

References

1965 deaths
Indian editors
Year of birth missing
Indian male journalists
The Hindu journalists